The Sandford Fleming Medal was instituted in 1982 by the Royal Canadian Institute. It consists of the Sandford Fleming Medal with Citation. It is awarded annually to a Canadian who has made outstanding contributions to the public understanding of science. It is named in honour of Sandford Fleming.

Awardees
Source: Royal Canadian Institute Science

1982: David Suzuki
1983: Lydia Dotto
1984: Lister Sinclair
1985: Helen Sawyer Hogg
1986: Jay Ingram
1987: J. Tuzo Wilson
1988: Fernand Seguin
1989: Fred Bruemmer
1990: Joan Hollobon and Marilyn Dunlop
1991: Annabel Slaight
1992: Terence Dickinson
1993: Carol Gold
1994: Edward Struzik
1995: Eve Savory
1996: Derek York
1997: John R. Percy
1998: Sid Katz
1999: John Charles Polanyi
2000: Ursula Martius Franklin
2001: J. N. Patterson Hume
2002: Bob McDonald
2003: Robert Buckman
2004: M. Brock Fenton
2005: Joe Schwartz
2006: Paul Fjeld
2007: Peter Calamai
2008: Henry Lickers
2009: David Schindler
2010: Paul Delaney
2011: John Dirks
2012: Robert Thirsk
2013: Chris Hadfield
2014: Penny Park
2015: Molly Shoichet
2016: Ivan Semeniuk
2018: John Smol
2019: Dan Falk
2020: Timothy Caulfield
2021: André Picard
2022 Dawn Bazely

See also 

 List of general science and technology awards

References

External links
Royal Canadian Institute

Awards established in 1982
Canadian science and technology awards
1982 establishments in Canada